Zvijezda in some Slavic languages means "star", and may refer to:

 Zvijezda (mountain), a mountain on the border of Serbia and Bosnia and Herzegovina
 Zvijezda, Vareš, a village in central Bosnia
 Zvijezda (Vareš), a mountain in central Bosnia
 NK Zvijezda Gradačac, a football club from Bosnia and Herzegovina

See also
Zvezda (disambiguation)